Commidendrum rugosum, known as scrubwood, is a species of flowering plant in the family Asteraceae.

Description
The plant is endemic to the island of Saint Helena, off the coast of Africa.

Its natural habitats are subtropical or tropical dry shrubland, rocky areas, and rocky shores.

It is an IUCN Red List Vulnerable species, threatened by habitat loss.

References

rugosum
Flora of Saint Helena
Vulnerable flora of Africa
Taxonomy articles created by Polbot
Plants described in 1836